Emine Demirtaş (born 1 August 1997) is a Turkish badminton player.

Achievements

BWF International Challenge/Series (2 runners-up) 
Mixed doubles

  BWF International Challenge tournament
  BWF International Series tournament
  BWF Future Series tournament

References

External links 
 

1997 births
Living people
Turkish female badminton players